This is a list of '''San Francisco State Gators football players in the NFL Draft.

Key

Selections
Source:

References

Lists of National Football League draftees by college football team

San Francisco State Gators NFL Draft